Adolphe Philippe Millot (1 May 1857, Paris –18 December 1921, also Paris) was a French painter, lithographer and entomologist.

Adolphe Philippe Millot, who illustrated many of the natural history sections of Petit Larousse, was the senior illustrator at Muséum national d'histoire naturelle.
He was a member of the Salon des Artistes Francaise (honourable mention, 1891) and the Société entomologique de France.

Gallery

References

External links

 Bénézit: Dictionnaire des peintres, sculpteurs, dessinateurs et graveurs, 2006. Éditions Gründ, Paris.

19th-century French painters
French male painters
20th-century French painters
20th-century French male artists
French entomologists
1857 births
1921 deaths
19th-century French male artists